Anthony Todd Farmer (born January 3, 1970) is an American former basketball player in the National Basketball Association (NBA).

A 6'9 forward born in Los Angeles, California and from the University of Nebraska, Farmer appeared in 304 games in the NBA between 1996 and 2000. He was a member of the Charlotte Hornets and Golden State Warriors, and averaged a career-high 6.3 points and four rebounds per game during the 1999–2000 season with Golden State. In the 2000–01 season Farmer played for Iraklis Thessaloniki, averaging 13.8 points and 9.0 rebounds per game in the SuproLeague. Farmer has also played in the CBA, ABA, France, Italy, and Russia. In June 2007, he was signed as a player-coach by the Orange County Gladiators of the ABA. He played in France, Italy, Greece, Spain, and Russia. He also played with the Miami Heat in 1996–97. Farmer played in Puerto Rico as well and was voted to the All DecadeTeam as one of the best imports to ever play in the BSN League. He won a championship in France with Besançon BBC

References

1970 births
Living people
American expatriate basketball people in Argentina
American expatriate basketball people in Belgium
American expatriate basketball people in France
American expatriate basketball people in Italy
American expatriate basketball people in Mexico
American expatriate basketball people in Russia
American expatriate basketball people in Spain
American men's basketball players
Atenas basketball players
Basketball players from Los Angeles
BC Oostende players
CB Breogán players
CB Murcia players
Charlotte Hornets players
Cholet Basket players
Columbus Horizon players
Denver Nuggets players
Dinamo Sassari players
Élan Béarnais players
Florida Beachdogs players
Fort Wayne Fury players
Galgos de Tijuana (basketball) players
Golden State Warriors players
Iraklis Thessaloniki B.C. players
Leones de Ponce basketball players
Liga ACB players
Maratonistas de Coamo players
Nebraska Cornhuskers men's basketball players
PBC Lokomotiv-Kuban players
Power forwards (basketball)
Rochester Renegade players
San Jose State Spartans men's basketball players
Sioux Falls Skyforce (CBA) players
Undrafted National Basketball Association players
Criollos de Caguas basketball players